Irish Riviera is a slang expression that can refer to any of several seaside communities in the United States with high population densities of Irish-Americans, including:

Indiana
Michigan City, a city in northwest Indiana on the shores of Lake Michigan
Massachusetts
Marshfield, a town south of Boston in Plymouth County on the Atlantic coast
Scituate, a town south of Boston in Plymouth County on the Atlantic coast
South Boston, a neighborhood of Boston
The South Shore, a region south of Boston Harbor along the Atlantic coast, which includes Scituate and Marshfield
Squantum, a peninsular area of Quincy, directly south of Boston
Michigan
New Buffalo, A city on Lake Michigan's Gold Coast 
New Jersey
Avon, a borough in central New Jersey on the Atlantic coast 
Belmar, a borough in central New Jersey on the Atlantic coast 
Lake Como, a borough in central New Jersey on the Atlantic coast 
Spring Lake, a borough in central New Jersey on the Atlantic coast
New York
Breezy Point, Queens, a neighborhood of the New York City borough of Queens  
Gerritsen Beach, Brooklyn, a neighborhood of the New York City borough of Brooklyn
Rockaway Beach, Queens, a neighborhood of the New York City borough of Queens

References

Irish-American neighborhoods